Roger Seydoux (28 March 1908 in Paris – 3 July 1985 in Paris) was a French academic and diplomat.

Main diplomatic assignments
 Last Resident-general in Tunisia
 First ambassador to Tunisia (1956)
 Ambassador to Morocco (1960-1962)
 Permanent representative to the United Nations (1962-1967)
 Permanent representative to NATO (1967-1968)
 Ambassador to the Soviet Union (1968-1972)

References

1908 births
1985 deaths
20th-century French diplomats
Ambassadors of France to Tunisia
Ambassadors of France to Morocco
Ambassadors of France to the Soviet Union
Permanent Representatives of France to the United Nations
Permanent Representatives of France to NATO
French residents-general in Tunisia